Top 40 Hits is the second full-length album by Anal Cunt, released in 1995 on CD and cassette by Earache Records.

The cover of this album is a parody of the compilation albums released in the 1970s by TV advertising company K-Tel.

The album was recorded in 1994 as part of the band's attempt to move from playing noisecore to playing fast hardcore songs, although the album contains both styles. There are also numerous cover songs on the album including those of Rupert Holmes's "Escape (The Pina Colada Song)", The Guess Who's "American Woman", Elton John's "I'm Still Standing", The A-Team theme song, and a cover of the Bee Gees song "Stayin' Alive". Their "Oi! version" of this song was also released as a promotional single before the album was released. Additionally, the song "Lenny's in My Neighborhood" parodies the Body Count song "There Goes the Neighborhood" both lyrically and musically. Seth Putnam said on his old website that he never got the sound he wanted with this album because it was recorded in an ADAT studio instead of an analog studio.

Track listing

Personnel

Musicians
Tim Morse – drums
John Kozik - guitar 
Paul Kraynak - guitar 
Seth Putnam - vocals 

Additional personnel
Tina Morrisey – production
Bruce Freisinger – production

References

Anal Cunt albums
1995 albums
Earache Records albums